Saint Catherine North East is a parliamentary constituency represented in the Parliament of Jamaica. It elects one Member of Parliament by the first past the post system of election. The constituency covers the north east part of Saint Catherine Parish. It is currently represented by Kerensia Morrison from the Jamaica Labour Party.

Boundaries 

Constituency covers Mount Industry, Troja and Guys Hill.

References

Parliamentary constituencies of Jamaica